Tracy Clayton (born c. 1982/1983) is an American writer known as the co-host of the BuzzFeed podcast Another Round, which has been on hiatus since 2017. Her work has been recognized by Fast Company, Ebony, and The Root, who described her as "a superstar at BuzzFeed, the millennial-driven media powerhouse where she writes big, funny things." Clayton was laid off from BuzzFeed in September 2018 amid company-wide downsizing. She hosts the Netflix podcast Strong Black Legends, for which she interviews African Americans in the entertainment industry.

Early life
Clayton was raised in Louisville, Kentucky and received her bachelor's degree from Transylvania University in Lexington.

Career
Before joining BuzzFeed full-time in 2014, Clayton wrote for Madame Noire, Uptown Magazine, The Urban Daily, PostBourgie and The Root. She developed the popular Tumblr, "Little Known Black History Facts", now a feature on Another Round.

She was named the Ida B. Wells Media Expert-in-Residence at Wake Forest University's Anna Julia Cooper Center from 2016–2017.

Another Round 

Clayton and her co-worker Heben Nigatu launched the first episode of Another Round, produced by BuzzFeed, on March 25, 2015. The show received positive critical acclaim. The A.V. Club described Clayton and Nigatu as "passionate and sharp in their distinct points of view." It was named to "Best of 2015" lists  by iTunes, Slate, Vulture, and The Atlantic.

An Okayplayer profile said, "known all over the digital world as one of the sharpest voices in the podcast game as well as Black Twitter, Tracy Clayton is consistently one of the smartest people in whatever room she occupies." Elle praised Clayton and co-host Heben Nigatu's ability to "serve up a blend of humor, politics, and frank observation that not even the most deft hosts can seem to replicate." Clayton made headlines in the fall when she pressed then-Presidential candidate Hillary Clinton to address the crime bill her husband passed as president: '[D]o you ever look at the state of black America and think, 'wow, we really fucked this up for black people?' " The Guardian praised their work as "witty, irreverent, intelligent." Also writing for The Guardian, critic Sasha Frere-Jones called Clayton and Nigatu "leading American cultural critics."

Clayton announced she had been laid off by BuzzFeed on September 19, 2018, along with most of the other staffers who had worked on BuzzFeed's original podcasts.

Post-BuzzFeed 
On February 11, 2019, Netflix's Strong Black Lead initiative announced it was launching a new podcast featuring interviews with legendary Black members of Hollywood, called Strong Black Legends, to be hosted by Clayton. The first podcast premiered on February 12, 2019 and Lynn Whitfield was the guest.

Clayton also hosts the interview podcast Going Through It launched by Mailchimp in July 2020, featuring 14 prominent Black women.

In August 2020, Back Issue debuted, a podcast hosted by Clayton and Josh Gwynn. Back Issue is produced by Pineapple Street Studios and looks back at formative moments in pop culture. Clayton and Gwynn formerly worked together on the Netflix podcast, Strong Black Legends.

Awards

 Fast Company, "Most Creative People" (2016)
 The Root, The Root 100 (2016)
 Ebony, Power 100, "Disruptor" (2017)

Personal life
As of at least March 2017, Clayton lives in Brooklyn.

References

External links

Official Twitter

Living people
21st-century American writers
Writers from Louisville, Kentucky
Transylvania University alumni
21st-century American women writers
American women podcasters
American podcasters
1982 births
BuzzFeed people
21st-century African-American women writers
21st-century African-American writers
20th-century African-American people
20th-century African-American women